The Magarey Medal is an Australian rules football honour awarded annually since 1898 to the fairest and most brilliant player in the South Australian National Football League (SANFL), as judged by field umpires. The award was created by William Ashley Magarey, then chairman of the league. The current recipient is Aaron Young.

History 
William Magarey was born in Adelaide, South Australia. A lawyer by vocation, he had an enduring interest in sports, although he did not play football.  He was, however, an active sports administrator who, in 1897, became the inaugural Chairman of the South Australian Football Association (later renamed the SANFL). The sport at that time was known for often rough play, and Magarey wanted to help combat this, and help gain more respect for umpires.

In 1898 Magarey presented the first Medal to South Australia’s "fairest and most brilliant player" of that season. Similar best and fairest player awards followed in other state-based competitions, notably the Sandover Medal in Western Australia from 1921 and Brownlow Medal in Victoria from 1924.

The Magarey Medal has been awarded in every year of SANFL competition since 1898, with the exception of 1900, 1904 (no record being extant), when the competition was suspended due to war 1916-1918, and when a restricted competition was held during the war period of 1942-1944.

After each match, the three field umpires (those umpires who control the flow of the game) confer and award 3, 2 and 1 point(s) to the players they regard as the best, second best and third best during the match. Players suspended for a reportable offence during the season are ineligible to win the award though they can continue gaining votes leading to times when an ineligible player would poll the most votes in the medal count but not win the medal. This occurred in 1912, 1968, 1983 and 1987 (see table below).

In the 1990s the awarding of the medal was changed so that players tied on the most votes would share the medal. Prior to this, a countback system was used, whereby the player with the most "best on ground" performances would be awarded the medal. In 1998, ten players who had finished runner-up over prior years owing to the countback rule were retrospectively awarded the Magarey Medal. A single design for the medal was used after this.

Recipients 
The first recipient of the Magarey Medal was Norwood’s Alby Green in 1898. 

 (*) signifies that 1 vote was awarded by 1 umpire each game.
 (**) signifies two umpires each awarded 3,2,1 votes each game.
 (***) signifies two umpires each awarded 5,3,1 votes each game.
 Those without an asterisk signify a maximum of 3 votes awarded each game along with 2 and 1.
 (****) Players who polled the most votes but were ineligible due to suspension: Peter Darley (1968, tied for first); Stephen Kernahan (1983, 44 votes); Garry McIntosh (1987, 25 votes); James Boyd (2012, 26 votes). In 1912 votes were not awarded; Harold Oliver was unanimously considered the competitions best player, but was declared ineligible for the award due to a fight with Ed Edwards of Norwood.

Multiple recipients
The following players have been multiple recipients of the medal.

Malcolm Blight (1972), John Platten (1984) and Nathan Buckley (1992) are Magarey Medallists who subsequently won a Brownlow Medal as best and fairest players in AFL/VFL competition.

References

External links
 SANFL History of the Magarey Medal

 

Awards established in 1898
Australian rules football awards
South Australian National Football League
1898 establishments in Australia
Australian rules football-related lists